This article provides details of international football games played by the Myanmar national football team from 2020 to present.

Results

2020

2021

2022

2023

See also
 Myanmar national football team
 Myanmar national football team results (1950–1999)
 Myanmar national football team results (2000–2009)
 Myanmar national football team results (2010–2019)

References

2020s in Burmese sport
Football in Myanmar
2020